Southaven is a city in DeSoto County, Mississippi, United States. It is a principal city in Greater Memphis. The 2020 census reported a population of 54,648, making it the third-largest city in Mississippi and the second-most populous suburb of Memphis. Southaven is traversed north to south by the I-55/I-69 freeway. The city's name derives from the fact that Southaven is located south of Whitehaven, a neighborhood in Memphis.

History
Southaven began as a village when Memphis homebuilder Kemmons Wilson (founder of Holiday Inn) wished to develop a few residential subdivisions featuring small starter homes just across the Mississippi border from what was then Whitehaven, Tennessee, an unincorporated area just a few miles south of the Memphis city limits. In the 1970s, Whitehaven has been eventually annexed by Memphis. Officially incorporated in 1980, Southaven is one of the fastest-growing cities in the southeastern United States. In just 20 years, Southaven doubled its land area, while its population tripled.

The construction of Interstate 55 through Southaven in the 1970s helped to promote growth and make for easier access to the city from Memphis, Jackson, St. Louis, and Chicago. Interstate 69, which will eventually run from Canada to Mexico, was cosigned with I-55 in Southaven in 2007.

In 1988, Baptist Hospital-DeSoto opened in Southaven as a two-story hospital. In 2001, Baptist DeSoto started an expansion project, nearly doubling the size of the hospital. In 2002, Baptist Hospital-DeSoto added an Outpatient Diagnostic Center and a Women's Center. In November 2006, Baptist DeSoto opened an eleven-story hospital tower that added 140 beds to the facility, allowing it to offer all private rooms. In addition, the new hospital tower added a new and expanded Emergency Department, more operating suites and space for future additions. It is the first high-rise building constructed in DeSoto County.

The exponential growth of Memphis International Airport (2 miles north of the city limits) in the 1980s led to increased air traffic over Southaven. The city continues to see large amounts of air traffic from Memphis International Airport, as flight paths to both north–south runways lead directly over the city. October 2007 saw the opening of Southaven's first large-scale shopping mall, Southaven Towne Center, which is located just south of Goodman Road between I-55/I-69 and Airways Boulevard. The mall is open-air with various stores and restaurants, including J.C. Penney, Dillard's, Gordmans, Sportsman's Warehouse, and Bed, Bath, and Beyond. Numerous buildings in Southaven were damaged on February 5, 2008, when an EF-2 tornado touched down during the so-called Super Tuesday tornado outbreak. Memphis television station WREG broadcast live images of the tornado as it moved through the city and into Memphis. No fatalities were reported in Southaven. By February 2011, Southaven had become the third-largest city in Mississippi. In the late 2000s, an outlet mall was proposed for Southaven. Tanger Outlets Southaven began construction in January 2015 and opened in November 2015. The mall, located near I-55/I-69 and Church Road, includes 70 outlet stores and outparcels of restaurants. Southaven was the boyhood home of noted novelist John Grisham, who also practiced law there for almost a decade, and of singer and songwriter Cory Branan.

Geography

Climate

April is the wettest month of the year, and August the driest.

Demographics

2020 census

As of the 2020 United States Census, there were 54,648 people, 19,735 households, and 14,073 families residing in the city.

2010 census 
As of the census of 2010, there were 48,982 people and 13,125 families residing in the city.

There were 19,904 households, out of which 37.3% had children under the age of 18 living with them, 50.9% were married couples living together, 16.6% had a female householder with no husband present, and 27.0% were non-families. 21.9% of all households were made up of individuals, and 4.8% had someone living alone who was 65 years of age or older. The average household size was 2.71 and the average family size was 3.16.

The racial makeup of the city was 71.0% White, 22.2% African American, 0.3% Native American, 1.7% Asian, 0.1% Pacific Islander, 3.0% from other races, 1.7% from two or more races, and Hispanic or Latino, 5.0% of the population.

In the city, the population was spread out, with 30.8% under the age of 20, 13.5% from 20 to 30, 15.8 from 30 to 40, 13.8% from 40 to 50, 11.1% from 50 to 60, and 14.9% who were 60 years of age or older. The median age was 34 years.

The median income for a household in the city was $46,691, and the median income for a family was $52,333. Males had a median income of $36,671 versus $26,557 for females. The per capita income for the city was $20,759. About 5.3% of families and 6.7% of the population were below the poverty line, including 8.2% of those under age 18 and 6.8% of those age 65 or over.

Arts and culture

Attractions

 Landers Center
 Southaven Towne Center
 Tanger Outlets Southaven
 Snowden Grove Park
 BankPlus Amphitheater at Snowden Grove
 Southaven Arena

Sports

Southaven's Snowden Grove Baseball Park hosts the annual Dizzy Dean Baseball World Series, where 5- to 19-year-old divisions are represented by teams from across the country.

The Memphis Grizzlies operate their NBA G League affiliate, the Memphis Hustle, at the Landers Center in Southaven.

From 2000 to 2018, Southaven hosted the Mississippi RiverKings at the Landers Center while they were members of the Central Hockey League and the Southern Professional Hockey League. The team relocated from Memphis prior to the 2000–01 season and was the main tenant of the Landers Center for most of their time in Southaven.

Southaven hosts the Memphis Americans (2021-) at the Landers Center. The Memphis Americans are a part of the National Indoor Soccer League (2021)

Education

Colleges and universities
 University of Mississippi – Desoto
 Northwest Mississippi Community College

Public secondary schools
Southaven is served by the DeSoto County School District.
 Southaven High School
 DeSoto County Career and Technology Center
 Southaven Intermediate School
 Southaven Middle School
 DeSoto Central High School
 DeSoto Central Middle School

Public elementary schools
 Greenbrook Elementary School
 Southaven Elementary School
 Hope Sullivan Elementary School
 DeSoto Central Elementary School
 DeSoto Central Primary School

Private schools
 Northpoint Christian School
 Church of God at Southaven Christian Academy 
 Sacred Heart School (of the Roman Catholic Diocese of Jackson)

Government

The mayor of Southaven is Darren Musselwhite, a Republican. He has served since June 28, 2013.

Media 
 DeSoto Times-Tribune

References

External links 

 City of Southaven official website
 Southaven Chamber of Commerce

 
Cities in DeSoto County, Mississippi
Cities in the Memphis metropolitan area
Cities in Mississippi
Populated places established in 1980